IC 4662, also known as ESO 102-14 is an irregular galaxy located in  the constellation Pavo 7.96 million light years away.  It was discovered by Robert Thorbun Ayton Innes in 1901.  It has a diameter of 7000 light years and an angular size of 3.2' x 1.9'.

IC 4662 is part of a Hubble study of starbursts in nearby, small, or dwarf, galaxies.  Based on this study, astronomers have found that starbursts continue 100 times longer than first thought, lasting 200 million to 400 million years.  These galaxies show that starbursts are not isolated events, but sweep across a galaxy.  On the Hubble image is one of the H II regions of the galaxy.

References 

4662
Irregular galaxies

Attribution This article contains text copied from https://spacetelescope.org/images/opo0919d/ credit NASA, ESA and K. McQuinn which is available under a CC-BY-4.0 license
Pavo (constellation)